The Yrdyk is a river in Jeti-Ögüz District of Issyk-Kul Region of Kyrgyzstan. It rises on north slopes of Teskey Ala-Too Range and flows into lake Issyk-Kul.
It is fed by majorly snow and ice meltwater (85%) and rains (15%). The flood flows may reach . Several breakthrough-prone lakes including Akkel, Karakel and Jashylkel are located in the basin of Yrdyk posing a risk of floods and mudflows. Yrdyk village is located near the river.

References

Rivers of Kyrgyzstan
Tributaries of Issyk-Kul